Garrett "Barry" Atwater (May 16, 1918 – May 24, 1978) was an American character actor who appeared frequently on television from the 1950s into the 1970s. He was sometimes credited as G.B. Atwater.

Life and career
The son of the landscape painter of the same name, Garrett Atwater was born in Denver, Colorado. He served as head of the UCLA Sound Department before he began his acting career.

He appeared in the student film A Time Out of War, a Civil War allegory that won the Oscar as best short film of 1954.

He was awarded a Special Cinema Award for television work in 1958.

Atwater, a character actor, received positive notice in Variety for his role in The Hard Man (1957), The True Story of Jesse James (1957), The True Story of Lynn Stuart (1958), Vice Raid (1959), and As Young As We Are (1958). About his work in the television show Judd for the Defense, Variety wrote, "Barry Atwater succeeded in bringing some life and a peculiar believability to an impossible role".

By 1960 he had achieved enough stature to be named by host Rod Serling in the on-screen promo as one of the stars of the well-known CBS Twilight Zone episode "The Monsters Are Due on Maple Street". Atwater made six guest appearances on Perry Mason including as murderer Robert Benson in the 1959 episode "The Case of the Dangerous Dowager" and as murder victim Dr. Stuart Logan in the 1965 episode "The Case of the Cheating Chancellor". A Variety review of the latter stated that Atwater played the part with "correct nastiness".

He played Benedict Arnold in an episode of Voyage to the Bottom of the Sea and received positive notice for an appearance on Playhouse 90.

Atwater in the mid-1960s spent three years on the ABC soap opera General Hospital while he also made prime-time appearances, billing himself as G.B. Atwater from 1963 to 1965, a period in which he was cast in supporting parts. About his nine-month stint on General Hospital, Atwater said, "It was a good experience and good income, but it got tiresome. Shows like that are written for women, and the men are all emasculated". In 1971 he guest-starred in a 2-part episode of Hawaii Five-0, “The Grandstand Play.” By the late 1960s and early 1970s, Atwater was again scoring primary guest-star roles, particularly on fantasy and science fiction series, including The Man From U.N.C.L.E., The Invaders s2ep20,The Wild Wild West, The Outer Limits, ("Corpus Earthling"), Night Gallery and Kung Fu, where his altered facial appearance suited his grim and sinister countenance due to its menacing and intense appearance.

On the stage 
Atwater performed regularly on stage throughout his career. In January 1958, it was announced that Atwater would be in a benefit performance in Passing of the Third Floor Back with the Episcopal Theatre Guild. He received positive notice in the Los Angeles Times for his appearance in Volpone. Atwater also appeared on stage in 1965 in The Disenchanted at the Actors Theatre. In 1966, he was in the Edward Albee play Tiny Alice at the Ivar Theatre. In 1968, he directed and performed in the play A Slight Ache at the Hollywood-Vine Methodist Center.

Sci-fi legacy
 
Atwater was one of the few actors to play a character from Spock's planet on Star Trek: The Original Series, portraying Surak, father of Vulcan philosophy, in the episode "The Savage Curtain". Atwater could not achieve the Vulcan salute naturally, so when he bids farewell in a medium shot, he has to first lower his arm so his hand is out of camera view as he pushes his fingers against his body to configure them properly.

Atwater's role as vampire Janos Skorzeny (pictured, far right) in the acclaimed TV thriller The Night Stalker (1972) made him a popular guest at 1970s fan gatherings that capitalized on the resurgence of classic horror during that decade.  Kevin Thomas of the Los Angeles Times praised Atwater's performance, writing, "that gifted character actor Barry Atwater is terrific as the vampire". Keith Ashwell of the Edmonton Journal wrote that Atwater was "a prince among vampires".

He also guest starred in the Outer Limits episode "Corpus Earthling" with Robert Culp as a scientist (Dr. Temple). 1963.

Personal life and death 
Atwater embraced and attributed his career success to the practice of Zen.

In 1956, Atwater's West Los Angeles home was burglarized after thieves removed a cat door to gain entry. Atwater was robbed of several hundred dollars' worth of clothes, jewelry, and other property.

Suffering from terminal cancer, he died from a stroke on May 24, 1978 in Los Angeles, shortly after his 60th birthday.

Selected filmography

References

External links

1918 births
1978 deaths
Male actors from Denver
American male film actors
American male soap opera actors
American male television actors
Deaths from cancer in California
20th-century American male actors
Western (genre) television actors